The 1985 Meath Senior Football Championship is the 93rd edition of the Meath GAA's premier club Gaelic football tournament for senior graded teams in County Meath, Ireland. The tournament consists of 14 teams, with the winner going on to represent Meath in the Leinster Senior Club Football Championship. The championship starts with a group stage and then progresses to a knock out stage.

Walterstown were the defending champions once again after they defeated Skryne in the previous years final to claim the "3-in-a-Row", but Skryne claimed their revenge when ending the Black's winning streak at the Semi-Final stage.

Slane returned to the senior grade after claiming the 1984 Meath Intermediate Football Championship title.

Navan O'Mahonys claimed their 11th S.F.C. title when defeating Skryne 0–10 to 0–7 in the final on 29 September 1985. Damien Sheridan raised the Keegan Cup for O'Mahonys while Joe Cassells claimed the 'Man of the Match' award.

Kilmainhamwood were regraded to the I.F.C. for 1986 after just 3 years in the grade.

Team Changes

The following teams have changed division since the 1984 championship season.

To S.F.C.
Promoted from I.F.C.
 Slane  -  (Intermediate Champions)

From S.F.C.
Regraded to I.F.C.
 Gaeil Colmcille 
 Martinstown/Athboy

Group stage

Group A

Round 1
 Walterstown 0-11, 1-4 Slane, 14/4/1985,
 Nobber 1-8, 0-9 Trim, 14/4/1985,
 Seneschalstown - Bye,

Round 2
 Walterstown 4-7, 0-7 Seneschalstown, 28/4/1985,
 Nobber 2–5, 1-8 Slane, 28/4/1985,
 Trim - Bye,

Round 3
 Nobber 0–6, 0-6 Seneschalstown, 5/5/1985,
 Slane w, l Trim, 
 Walterstown - Bye,

Round 4
 Seneschalstown 1-7, 1-6 Slane, 9/6/1985,
 Walterstown w, l Trim,
 Nobber - Bye,

Round 5
 Walterstown 2-5, 0-7 Nobber, 7/7/1985,
 Seneschalstown 1-9, 0-4 Trim, 21/7/1985,
 Slane - Bye,

Group B

Round 1
 Navan O'Mahonys 3-6, 1-7 Moynalvey, 14/4/1985,
 St. Patrick's 1-8, 0-5 Ballivor, 14/4/1985,
 Summerhill - Bye,

Round 2
 Navan O'Mahonys 2-7, 1-7 Summerhill, 28/4/1985,
 Moynalvey w, l Ballivor,
 St. Patrick's - Bye,

Round 3
 Summerhill 2-13, 0-2 Ballivor, 5/5/1985,
 Moynalvey 1-8, 0-8 St. Patrick's, 5/5/1985,
 Navan O'Mahonys - Bye,

Round 4
 Summerhill 0-7, 0-5 Moynalvey, 16/6/1985,
 Navan O'Mahonys 1-11, 0-9 St. Patrick's, 16/6/1985,
 Ballivor - Bye,

Round 5
 Summerhill 3-9, 0-5 St. Patrick's, 7/7/1985,
  Navan O'Mahonys 0-10, 1-1 Ballivor, 14/7/1985,
 Moynalvey - Bye,

Group C

Round 1
 Skryne 2-9, 0-8 Syddan, 14/4/1985,
 Castletown 0-7, 0-6 Kilmainhamwood, 14/4/1985,

Round 2
 Skryne 6-14, 1-0 Kilmainhamwood, 28/4/1985,
 Castletown 1-6, 1-5 Syddan, 28/4/1985,

Round 3
 Skryne 1-11, 1-7 Castletown, 9/6/1985,
 Syddan w/o, scr Kilmainhamwood,

Knock-out Stages
The teams in the quarter-finals are the second placed teams from each group and the Group C winner. The teams in the semi finals are Group A and B winners along with the quarter final winners.

Quarter-Finals:
 Castletown 2-5, 0-9 Seneschalstown, Pairc Tailteann, 25/8/1985,
 Skryne 0-11, 0-3 Summerhill, Pairc Tailteann, 25/8/1985,

Semi-Finals:
 Navan O'Mahonys 4-6, 2-3 Castletown, Pairc Tailteann, 8/9/1985,
 Skryne 1-12, 1-4 Walterstown, Pairc Tailteann, 8/9/1985,

Final:
 Navan O'Mahonys 0-10, 0-7 Skryne, Pairc Tailteann, 29/9/1985,

References

External links

Meath Senior Football Championship
Meath Senior Football Championship